The 2006–07 Kent Football League season was the 41st in the history of Kent Football League a football competition in England.

League table

The league featured 15 clubs which competed in the previous season, along with two new clubs:
Croydon, transferred from the Isthmian League Division Two
Faversham Town, joined from the Kent County League

League table

References

External links

2006-07
9